Benjamin Elbert Douglas Sr. (September 3, 1894 – July 27, 1981) was the mayor of Charlotte, North Carolina from 1935 to 1941. He administered the construction of an airport for Charlotte. Charlotte Douglas International Airport, as the airport is named today, was named after him in 1954. A Democrat, he was also the first mayor of Charlotte who was directly elected by voters pursuant to a change in the city charter.

Biography
Douglas was born in Iredell County, North Carolina on September 3, 1894.  He served in the United States Army during World War I.

In 1946 Ben Douglas founded Douglas Furs, after Franklin D. Roosevelt asked a personal favor of Ben Sr. – to find a way to clean the fleece-lined fur-trimmed flight jackets for the soldiers flying in the then current war in Europe. He used his knowledge gained in the dry cleaning business (he owned one in Charlotte prior) and his ingenuity gained him a government contract and later a thriving business in the fur trade. Douglas also was the relentless lobbyist for the now well-traveled Independence Boulevard. Mary Louise Douglas (his widow) continued to work at Douglas Furs 3 days a week until her death on December 29, 2007. The store is lined with historical text, newspaper articles of his election, and pictures of Ben and his accomplishments.

Douglas directed the North Carolina Department of Conservation and Development from 1953 to 1955. In 1956, Douglas unsuccessfully ran for Congress.

References

External links
Political Graveyard
Ben E. Douglas (1935–1941) – City of Charlotte website.

1894 births
1981 deaths
Mayors of Charlotte, North Carolina
North Carolina Democrats
People from Iredell County, North Carolina
United States Army personnel of World War I
20th-century American politicians